Amelia Louise Crouch (born 27 March 2004) is an English actress. She began her career as a child actress on the West End. Her films include The Woman in Black: Angel of Death (2014), Alice Through the Looking Glass (2016), The Limehouse Golem (2016), Extinction (2018), and The Cursed (2021).

Early life
Crouch is from Epsom. Her brother Oliver is also an actor, and they took classes at Stagecoach Sutton, which their mother Rachel runs in addition to Audition Ready and Happy Feet Management. Crouch attended Southfield Park Primary School and then Rosebery School for Girls. She went on to train at Arts Educational School (ArtsEd).

Career
Crouch made her professional stage debut in 2011 as a munchkin in Andrew Lloyd Webber's The Wizard of Oz at the London Palladium. She then appeared in an alternating role in Fatal Attraction at the Theatre Royal Haymarket in 2014. That same year, Crouch made her film debut in The Woman in Black: Angel of Death followed by her television debut in an installment of the Sky Arts anthology Playhouse Presents the following year.

In 2016, Crouch played younger versions of characters, including Sophie Cookson's Pippa in The Huntsman: Winter's War, Anne Hathaway's White Queen in Alice Through the Looking Glass, Olivia Cooke's Elizabeth "Lizzie" Cree in The Limehouse Golem, as well as Ellise Chappell's Jennifer Strange in the Sky One television film The Last Dragonslayer. This was followed by a starring role as Hanna in the 2018 science fiction film Extinction. In 2021, she played Charlotte in The Cursed and a younger version of Mary Elizabeth Winstead's titular character in Kate.

Filmography

Film

Television

Stage

Awards and nominations

References

External links
 
 Amelia Crouch at Curtis Brown

2004 births
Actresses from Surrey
English child actresses
English musical theatre actresses
People educated at the Arts Educational Schools
People from Epsom
Talent managers